In convex analysis, Popoviciu's inequality is an inequality about convex functions. It is similar to Jensen's inequality and was found in 1965 by Tiberiu Popoviciu, a Romanian mathematician.

Formulation 

If f is convex, then for any three points x, y, z in I,

When f is strictly convex, the inequality is strict except for x = y = z.

Generalizations 
It can be generalized to any finite number n of points instead of 3, taken on the right-hand side k at a time instead of 2 at a time:

Popoviciu's inequality can also be generalized to a weighted inequality.

Notes

Inequalities
Convex analysis